Passchendaele is a rural locality in the Southern Downs Region, Queensland, Australia.

The undeveloped town of Messines is located within the locality.

Passchendaele's postcode is 4380.

History 
The locality takes its name from the former Passchendaele railway station on the Amiens railway line which served the soldier settlement fruit growing areas. It was named by the Queensland Railways Department in 1920, after the famous  battleground in World War I.

Similarly, the town of Messines took its name from the Messines railway station on the Amiens line in the soldier settlement area. It was named after the village of Messines in West Flanders, about 15 kilometres south of Ypres, where Australian troops fought in the 1917 Battle of Messines.

Education 
There are no schools in Passchendaele. The nearest government primary schools are Pozieres State School in neighbouring Pozieres to the east and Amiens State School in neighbouring Amiens to the south. The nearest government secondary school is Stanthorpe State High School in Stanthorpe to the south-east.

References 

Southern Downs Region
Localities in Queensland